The Fineilspitze is a peak in the Schnalskamm group of  the Ötztal Alps on the border between Tyrol, Austria, and South Tyrol, Italy. It is known for being the discovery site of Ötzi.

References 
Austrian Alpenverein 
Alpenverein South Tyrol

External links 

Mountains of the Alps
Mountains of Tyrol (state)
Mountains of South Tyrol
Alpine three-thousanders
Ötztal Alps
Austria–Italy border
International mountains of Europe